The 2002–03 Algerian Cup was the 39th edition of the Algerian Cup. USM Alger won the Cup by defeating CR Belouizdad 2-1 in extra time in the final after the game ended 1-1. It was USM Alger's sixth Algerian Cup in its history.

Round of 64

Round of 32

Round of 16

Quarter-finals

Semi-finals

Matches

Final

Champions

External links
 Coupe d'Algérie 2003
 2002/03 Coupe Nationale

Algerian Cup
Algerian Cup
Algerian Cup